The 2nd Guards Uhlan Regiment was a cavalry regiment of the Prussian Army formed in 1819 in Potsdam, Prussia, and served as a Guards regiment garrisoned in Berlin.

Regiment history
By order of the King Frederick William III of Prussia, the regiment was first formed in 1817 in the Grand Duchy of Posen as the Posensche Garde Landwehr Squadron. Garrisoned in Posen, in 1819 the light cavalry Landwehr regiment was merged with the Litthauische Guard Landwehr Squadron (1818) and the Thüringische and Clevische Guard Landwehr squadron to form the Guard Landwehr Cavalry Regiment. The regiment garrison on its reformation moved to Potsdam and by 3 August 1821 its size was increased by another four landwehr squadrons.

By 1821 however the decision was also made to divide the regiment into the 1st and 2nd Guard Landwehr Cavalry Regiment. On 30 March 1826 the regiment received the designation 2. Guard Uhlan (Landwehr) Regiment, which on 2 October 1851 was changed to be the 2 Guard Uhlan Regiment. Prior to the Franco-Prussian War of 1870-1871, the regiment was garrisoned in Berlin and Charlottenburg, when a new barracks was built in the borough of Berlin-Moabit. Although mostly a reserve guards regiment, the regiment was first deployed to break up barricades erected in Berlin during the March Revolution of 1848.

The regiment was first fully deployed for the Austro-Prussian war in 1866, being deployed in Silesia and Bohemia and the Franco-Prussian war in 1870. In France, the regiment initially deployed in Lorraine before moving to assist in the Siege of Paris.

First World War

In World War I the regiment was part of the Guards Cavalry Division fighting on the Western Front. After the mobilization the regiment moved through Belgium and was involved in the First Battle of the Marne before the general retreat to Reims, where it dismounted and was involved in trench warfare as well as signaling operations. By September 1914, the regiment was divided, with 3rd and 4th Squadrons (2nd half-regiment) sent to the 2nd Cavalry Division and the 1st and 2nd Squadrons (1st half-regiment) remaining in the 2nd Guards Infantry Division.

1st half-regiment: On 20 November 1914, it moved into Russian Poland and by August 1915 moved into Vilna, as a part of the Gorlice–Tarnów Offensive. By the end of October 1915, the half-regiment was involved in operations in Courland and was involved in the capture of Riga in September 1917. In November 1917, the unit moved back to the Western Front where they remained till the end of the war.

2nd half-regiment: It remained first on the Western Front and in April 1915 was transferred to Galicia, but soon returned to the Western Front. In 1917 it again returned to the Eastern Front in action around Vilna before returning to the West, where it remained until the end of the war.

After the end of the war, in December 1918 the squadrons reunified and returned to Berlin, where the regiment was demobilized and then dissolved in 1919. The traditions of the regiment were continued by the Reichswehr, within the 4th Squadron of the 4th (Prussian) Reiter-Regiment in Perleberg. In 1923 a memorial containing the names of members of the regiment killed during the war was unveiled in Berlin-Moabit by the last commander of the regiment, Ludwig Karl Maria Graf von Maldeghem.

Uniform
The peacetime uniform was a traditional Uhlan uniform consisting of a Ulanka tunic of red and blue with gold facings. A czapka with blue top and white plume was worn in full dress. These colourful uniforms were replaced excepting ceremonial situations in 1913 by the Feldgrau service uniform with brown leather boots and straps and the Tschapka covered by a feldgrau fabric covering.

Regiment commanders

See also
List of Imperial German cavalry regiments

References

 
 Max Hein: Das kleine Buch vom Deutschen Heere . Lipsius und Tischer, Kiel 1901 (German).
 Johann David von Dziengel: Geschichte des Königlichen Zweiten Ulanen-Regiments : zugleich enthaltend: Die Geschichte der Towarczys von 1675; die Geschichte der Bosniaken von 1745; des Tartaren-Pulks von 1795; der Towarczys von 1800, als der zum Theil den Stamm bildenden Truppen ; mit Beiträgen zur Biographie der bekannten Generale v. Ruesch, v. Lossow, Freiherrn v. Günther und v. L'Estocq . - Potsdam : Riegel, 1858 (German). Digitised available: http://digital.ub.uni-duesseldorf.de/urn/urn:nbn:de:hbz:061:1-34019

Guards cavalry regiments of the Prussian Army
Military units and formations established in 1819
1919 disestablishments in Germany
Military units and formations disestablished in 1919